The Leipers Limestone is a geologic formation in Kentucky, Tennessee, Alabama and Georgia. It preserves fossils dating back to the Ordovician Period.

See also

 List of fossiliferous stratigraphic units in Kentucky

References

 

Ordovician Kentucky
Ordovician Alabama
Ordovician Georgia (U.S. state)